Julian Yee Zhi-Jie (born 26 May 1997) is a Malaysian figure skater. He is the 2017 and 2019 Southeast Asian Games gold medalist, 2015 CS Denkova-Staviski Cup silver medalist, 2016 Asian Open Figure Skating Trophy and 2013 Skate Down Under bronze medalist, as well as five-time Malaysian senior national champion (2013–2017). He has competed in the final segment at ten ISU Championships, including four World Championships. He represented Malaysia at the 2018 Winter Olympics.

Personal life
Julian Yee Zhi-Jie was born on 26 May 1997 in Kuala Lumpur, Malaysia. His mother, Irene Cheow, served as the deputy president of the Ice Skating Association of Malaysia from 2012 to 2014. He has two brothers, Ian and Ryan Yee Zhi-Jwen. Ryan has also competed internationally in figure skating.

Career

Early years
Julian Yee began learning to skate at age four at the Sunway Pyramid Ice Rink in Malaysia. He and his brothers were introduced to skating by their mother, Irene. Harry Janto Leo became his coach in 2004.

During his early years, Yee competed only in ISI-sanctioned competitions, which were regarded as recreational skating. He won the elementary category at the inaugural Malaysian National Championships and defended his title the following year. He learned all his double jumps by the age of twelve. He was selected by Ice Skating Association of Malaysia to participate in the 2009 Korean Dream Program in PyeongChang.

In 2010, Yee received additional coaching from Chen Lu and Denis Petrov. In 2011, he became the youngest skater to win the Junior Men's category, at age 13 years 10 months, thereby breaking the previous record held by his brother, Ryan Yee Zhi-Jwen.

2011–12 to 2012–13
In the 2011–12 season, Yee was selected to represent Malaysia in the ISU Junior Grand Prix. He competed at events in Milan, Italy and Tallinn, Estonia, but failed to reach the free skate.

In 2013, Yee became first Malaysian to obtain the qualifying scores for the World Junior Championships. He finished 34th in the short program and did not qualify for the free skate. He learned most of the triple jumps by sixteen.

2013–14 to 2014–15
In 2014, Yee became the first Malaysian to reach the free skate at a Four Continents Championships. One of the youngest skaters at the event, held in Taipei City from 20–25 January 2014, he qualified for the free skate and finished 23rd overall. At the 2014 Malaysian Open National Championship, Yee held the lead after the short program and defended his title to become only the second Malaysian skater to win the Senior Men's title in consecutive years.

In the 2014–15 JGP season, Yee finished sixth in Aichi, Japan, scoring personal bests in the short program, free skate, and combined total. In March 2015, competing at his fourth World Junior Championships, he qualified for the free skate and finished 19th overall. He also managed to qualify for Malaysia their first ever Youth Winter Olympics spot but he was not able to compete in it as he was over-aged.

2015–16 season
Yee started the 2015–16 JGP season with a 7th-place result in Riga, Latvia, scoring personal bests in the short, free skate and combined total (176.79). After placing first in the junior category at the 2015 Skate Canada Summer Skate in Thornhill, he competed at the JGP in Logroño, Spain and finished 4th – the highest result by a Malaysian in the Junior Grand Prix. He won his first ISU Challenger Series medal, silver, at the Denkova-Staviski Cup.

Yee finished 15th at the 2016 Four Continents Championships in Taipei after placing 15th in the short and 14th in the free. In March, he qualified for the free skate at the 2016 World Championships in Boston; he ranked 22nd in the short, 19th in the free, and 21st overall. During the season, he trained in Petaling Jaya and Barrie, Ontario, coached by Michael Hopfes and Doug Leigh.

Yee has also trained in the Elvis Stojko Arena (Toronto, Canada), the Chinese National Arena (Harbin, China), and the Beijing Capital Gymnasium (Beijing, China).

2016–17 season 
Yee won bronze at the Asian Open Trophy, held in Manila in August 2016. He then relocated to Barrie, Ontario to train full-time, taking a gap year off his university studies. He competed at two ISU Challenger Series events, placing 4th at the 2016 CS Nebelhorn Trophy in September and 5th at the 2016 CS Warsaw Cup in October.

Yee finished 15th overall at the 2017 Four Continents Championships in Pyeongchang, South Korea, and then went directly to Sapporo, Japan to compete at his first Asian Winter Games; he placed 8th with a new personal best of 222.69 points.

In March, he reached the final segment and finished 22nd overall at the 2017 World Championships in Helsinki, Finland.

2017–18 season 
In August 2017, Yee won gold at the 2017 Southeast Asian Games.

Yee represented Malaysia in the 2018 Pyeongchang Winter Olympics, together with Jeffrey Webb. He got a personal best score of 73.58 in the short program, and barely missed qualifying for the free skate. Yee is the first ever Malaysian figure skater to qualify for this event.

Programs

Competitive highlights
GP: Grand Prix; CS: ISU Challenger Series; JGP: ISU Junior Grand Prix

Detailed results 

Further to the introduction of the +5 / -5 GOE for the season 2018/19, all statistics will restart from zero. All previous statistics are now considered historical

Senior level

Junior level

References

External links

 
 
 
  (Fansite)

1997 births
Living people
Malaysian sportspeople of Chinese descent
Sportspeople from Kuala Lumpur
Malaysian male single skaters
Figure skaters at the 2017 Asian Winter Games
Asian Games competitors for Malaysia
Figure skaters at the 2018 Winter Olympics
Olympic figure skaters of Malaysia
Southeast Asian Games gold medalists for Malaysia
Southeast Asian Games medalists in figure skating
Competitors at the 2017 Southeast Asian Games
Competitors at the 2019 Southeast Asian Games